The trend of celebrities owning wineries and vineyards is not a recent phenomenon, though it has certainly garnered more attention in today's Information Age. In ancient Greek and Roman times, the leading philosophers, playwrights, politicians and generals of the day often owned vineyards for personal use.  Usually celebrities have a large amount of wealth accumulated, which makes the significant investment of opening a winery or vineyard negligible.

There are many reasons that celebrities gravitate to the world of wine. Starting a winery or vineyard, as with nearly any business, can offer some tax benefits. Some celebrities, such as the Italian-American director Francis Ford Coppola, come from a family with a long history of winemaking. Some, such as the British singer Cliff Richard, have been lifelong wine enthusiasts and enter the wine industry in order to do something that they enjoy. Others like the challenge of a new enterprise. Some celebrities enter the wine industry simply because they can.

While some celebrities, such as the American actors Brad Pitt, Angelina Jolie, Johnny Depp, British association football star David Beckham and his wife Victoria Beckham, own vineyards and wine estates solely for personal use, some celebrities leverage their name recognition as a selling tool in the wine industry. Today celebrity-owned wineries can be lucrative business endeavors. In 2007, Nielsen research of supermarket wine purchases showed that sales of celebrity wines were up 19% over previous years.

Types of celebrity involvement

Celebrities have different degrees of involvement in their wineries and vineyards. Nearly all of them partner, in some form of collaboration, with a winery or winemaker who is already established in the industry. An example of this is retired American football player Joe Montana, who partnered with longtime Beringer winemaker Ed Sbragia to make their joint venture wine Montagia. While Sbragia oversees most of the viticultural and winemaking tasks, Montana is involved in deciding on the overall "vision" of the wine and participates in tasting and blending trials.

Similarly, the celebrity may own their own "wine brand" that is produced with their collaborating winery instead of owning a physical winery or wine estate itself. An example of this is the brand Mike Ditka Wines, owned by former American football coach Mike Ditka. The wine is produced in partnership at the physical winemaking facilities of the Mendocino Wine Company. While it could be described as a "winery", technically Mike Ditka Wines is a "wine brand" owned by Ditka, who participates in blending and tasting trials. Other celebrities, such as French actor Gérard Depardieu, are very active in both the production and business dealings of the winery. Depardieu, who owns wineries in several countries across the globe, even has his passport listing his occupation as vigneron.

Some celebrities may only have "legacy" attachments to the wines that bear their names. One example is the Gallo wine brand MacMurray Ranch, which uses some grapes grown on a California ranch that was once owned by the American actor Fred MacMurray. Under his ownership, the ranch was dedicated mostly to raising horses. After MacMurray died, his family sold most of the land to the Gallo family, but are still involved with the winery. 

Another "legacy" celebrity who was more intimately connected with the winery that now carries his name was the American actor Raymond Burr. Burr bought the ranch with his domestic partner and planted grapevines for wine production before he died in 1993. His partner, Robert Benevides, renamed the estate after Burr and continued making wines featuring his name.

Some celebrities lend their names to a winery for a special one-time wine production. Mexican-American musician Carlos Santana partnered with the Champagne house G.H. Mumm to create a sparkling wine in 2005 titled Santana DVX. While Santana helped select the final blend and received royalties for the use of his name and image, he doesn't particularly "own" the brand nor does he continue to be involved in the wine industry.

American musician Bob Dylan participated in a similar arrangement with the Italian winery Fattoria Le Terrazze. Dylan gave permission for the winery to use his name, likeness and album art to create a wine that pays tribute to his 1974 album Planet Waves. In 2007, American entrepreneur Martha Stewart announced a collaboration with the American winery Gallo to produce value-marketed wines to be sold at Kmart, which also featured her Martha Stewart Living line of housewares. In 2009, British chef Gordon Ramsay allowed a Bordeaux winery to use his name, without royalties, to celebrate the release of their 10th vintage.

Hall of Fame Quarterback John Elway found his way to wine ownership in 2015 as an restaurateur through his four Colorado based steak house appropriately named, Elway's.  The wines are now sold in 35 states. Proceeds from their wines benefit a veterans organization called Team Rubicon.

List of celebrities

Below is a partial listing of celebrities who own commercial wineries, wine brands or vineyards. This is not a listing of celebrities who only own vineyards for private use.

See also 

 List of wine professionals

References

Wineries and vineyards
Lists of vineyards and wineries